Dávid Holman (born 17 March 1993) is a Hungarian football player who plays for Slovan Bratislava.

Club career

Ferencváros
On 5 May 2012, Holman played his first match in the team of Ferencváros Budapest against Siófok in the 2011–12 season of the Hungarian League.

On 12 November 2012, he signed his first professional contract with Ferencváros Budapest.

On 10 August 2013, Holman scored his first goal in the Hungarian League when playing against the title-holders, ETO Győr in the 58th minute in the 2013–14 season.

On 9 December 2014, Holman extended his contract with Ferencváros.

Lech Poznań
On 16 January 2015, Ferencváros loaned Holman to Ekstraklasa club Lech Poznań for one year.

Slovan Bratislava
On 15 August 2017, Holman was signed by Slovak club SK Slovan Bratislava. It was also revealed that Slovan Bratislava paid 700,000 euros for the Hungarian midfielder.

International career
He made his Hungary national football team debut on 8 June 2019 in a Euro 2020 qualifier against Azerbaijan, as a 58th-minute substitute for Dominik Szoboszlai and scored the last goal in a 3–1 victory.

Career statistics

Club

1 Including Polish SuperCup.

International goals
Scores and results list Hungary's goal tally first.

Honours

Club
Lech Poznań
 Ekstraklasa: 2014–15
 Polish SuperCup: 2015

Slovan Bratislava
Fortuna Liga (4): 2018–19, 2019–20, 2020–21, 2021–22
Slovak Cup (3): 2017–18, 2019–20, 2020–21

References

External links

MLSZ

1993 births
Living people
Hungarian footballers
Hungary youth international footballers
Hungary under-21 international footballers
Hungary international footballers
Hungarian expatriate footballers
Association football midfielders
Vác FC players
Ferencvárosi TC footballers
Lech Poznań players
Debreceni VSC players
Nemzeti Bajnokság I players
Ekstraklasa players
Expatriate footballers in Poland
Hungarian expatriate sportspeople in Poland
Footballers from Budapest